Urodacus koolanensis is a species of scorpion in the Urodacidae family. It is endemic to Australia, and was first described in 1977 by L. E. Koch.

Description
The holotype is 60 mm in length. Colouration is mainly yellowish-brown.

Distribution and habitat
The species occurs in north-western Western Australia.

References

 

 
koolanensis
Scorpions of Australia
Endemic fauna of Australia
Fauna of Western Australia
Animals described in 1977